Bonzon is a surname. Notable people with the surname include:

Annick Bonzon (born 1971), Swiss alpine skier
Paul-Jacques Bonzon (1908–1978), French writer

See also
Bonson (surname)